Maret Balkestein-Grothues, née Maret Grothues (born 16 September 1988) is a Dutch volleyball player who plays as a wing spiker. She is a member of the Netherlands women's national volleyball team, and is the current team captain. On 6 May 2021 she signed for the Greek powerhouse Panathinaikos.

Grothues started playing volleyball with the Dutch club Krekkers in 1996, inspired by the male national team winning the Olympic gold in Atlanta 1996. She made her international debut in the Dutch national team at the opening match of the Montreux Volley Masters against Cuba in June 2008. Grothues did not play in the national team in 2014, due to an Achilles heel injury. At the 2010 World Championship she won the "best server" trophy. She played at the European Championships in 2012, 2013 and 2014. In 2015, she was promoted to team captain prior to the 2015 European Games in Baku, Azerbaijan. As of 2016 she has 244 caps.

During the 2016 Summer Olympics, where the Dutch women made their Olympic return after 20 years,  Balkestein-Grothues injured her ankle during the second game of the group stage. Thus she only returned for the knockout rounds, seeing limited minutes as the Netherlands finished fourth.

Awards

Individuals
2010 FIVB World Championship "Best Server"

Clubs
 2008–09 Dutch Volleyball League  Champion, with DELA/Martinus Amstelveen
 2008–09 Dutch Volleyball Cup  Winner, with DELA/Martinus Amstelveen
 2009–10 Dutch Volleyball League  Champion, with TVC Amstelveen
 2009–10 Dutch Volleyball Cup  Winner, with TVC Amstelveen
 2013–14 French Volleyball League  Champion, with RC Cannes
 2013–14 French Volleyball Cup  Winner, with RC Cannes
 2014–15 French Volleyball League  Champion, with RC Cannes
 2016–17 Turkish Volleyball League  Champion, with Fenerbahçe
 2016–17 Turkish Volleyball Cup  Winner, with Fenerbahçe
 2021–22 Greek Volleyball League  Champion, with Panathinaikos
 2021–22 Greek Volleyball Cup  Winner, with Panathinaikos

Personal
Maret Grothues married the Dutch hockey player Marcel Balkestein on 5 July 2014 and became Maret Balkestein-Grothues, following Dutch convention.

References

External links
FIVB profile
 

1988 births
Living people
Volleyball players at the 2016 Summer Olympics
Dutch women's volleyball players
Sportspeople from Almelo
Dutch expatriate sportspeople in France
Dutch expatriate sportspeople in Poland
Dutch expatriate sportspeople in Turkey
Dutch expatriate sportspeople in Romania
Expatriate volleyball players in France
Expatriate volleyball players in Poland
Expatriate volleyball players in Turkey
Expatriate volleyball players in Romania
Lokomotiv Baku volleyball players
Volleyball players at the 2015 European Games
European Games competitors for the Netherlands
Fenerbahçe volleyballers
Panathinaikos Women's Volleyball players
Wing spikers
Olympic volleyball players of the Netherlands
Aydın Büyükşehir Belediyespor volleyballers
Dutch expatriate sportspeople in Azerbaijan
Dutch expatriate sportspeople in Greece
Dutch expatriate sportspeople in Italy
Expatriate volleyball players in Azerbaijan
Expatriate volleyball players in Greece
Expatriate volleyball players in Italy